"Back Street Pickup" is a song by Australian hard rock band, the Angels, released in July 1990 as the third single from their ninth studio album Beyond Salvation. The song peaked at number 23 on the ARIA Charts and reached number 29 on the Recorded Music NZ chart.

Track listing 
 Mushroom (K 10131)
 Back Street Pickup (Doc Neeson, Bob Spencer, Richard Brewster, James Morley, Terry Manning) - 4:27
 Take It Easy (Spencer, Neeson, R Brewster, Manning) - 6:05
 Fashion And Fame (Live) (Neeson, John Brewster, R Brewster) - 4:49
 Love Takes Care (Live) (Neeson, J Brewster, R Brewster) - 4:41

Personnel 
 Doc Neeson – lead vocals
 Rick Brewster – lead guitar
 Bob Spencer – rhythm guitar, backing vocals
 James Morley – bass guitar, backing vocals
 Brent Eccles – drums

Production
 Terry Manning - producers (tracks: 1 & 2)

Charts

Weekly charts

Year-end charts

References

External links 

The Angels (Australian band) songs
Mushroom Records singles
1990 songs
1990 singles
Songs written by Doc Neeson